Jahmai Fitzgerald Jones (born August 4, 1997) is an American professional baseball outfielder and second baseman in the Los Angeles Dodgers organization. He made his Major League Baseball (MLB) debut with the Los Angeles Angels in 2020. He has also played for the Baltimore Orioles.

Amateur career
Jones attended the Wesleyan School in Peachtree Corners, Georgia. As a senior, he hit .464 with eight home runs, 21 runs batted in (RBIs), and 40 stolen bases and was named the Gwinnett Daily Post Baseball Player of the Year. He was selected by the Los Angeles Angels of Anaheim in the second round of the 2015 Major League Baseball draft.

Professional career

Los Angeles Angels
Jones made his professional debut with the Arizona League Angels and spent all of 2015 there, posting a .244 batting average with two home runs, 20 RBIs and 16 stolen bases. In 2016, Jones started the season with the Orem Owlz and was promoted to the Burlington Bees during the season. He finished 2016 batting .302 with four home runs, 30 RBIs and twenty stolen bases in 64 games between both clubs.

In 2017, Jones played for both Burlington and the Inland Empire 66ers, posting a combined .282 batting average with 14 home runs, 47 RBIs, 27 stolen bases and a .794 OPS in 127 games. In 2018, Jones played with Inland and the Mobile BayBears, slashing .239/.337/.380 with 10 home runs, 55 RBIs, and 24 stolen bases in 123 games. In 2019, Jones spent the season with the Mobile BayBears, batting .234/.308/.324 with five home runs, fifty RBIs, and nine stolen bases over 130 games. Following the season, he was selected to play in the Arizona Fall League for the Mesa Solar Sox, and also, he was added to the Angeles 40-man roster.

On August 31, 2020, Jones made his MLB debut as a pinch runner. On September 26, 2020, Jones got his first career hit off of Tony Gonsolin of the Los Angeles Dodgers.

Baltimore Orioles
On February 2, 2021, Jones was traded to the Baltimore Orioles in exchange for pitcher Alex Cobb. He was assigned to the Triple-A Norfolk Tides to begin the season. He underwent Tommy John surgery on May 27, 2022, and was designated for assignment on May 28. He was released on June 3.

Los Angeles Dodgers
Jones signed a two-year minor league contract with the Los Angeles Dodgers on July 23, 2022.

Personal life
His father, Andre Jones, played in the National Football League (NFL) for the Detroit Lions. He died in 2011 due to a brain aneurysm. His brother, T. J. Jones, is an NFL wide receiver. His other brother, Malachi Jones, plays in the National Arena League (NAL) for the Albany Empire.

References

External links

1997 births
Living people
Aberdeen IronBirds players
African-American baseball players
Arizona League Angels players
Baltimore Orioles players
Baseball players from Georgia (U.S. state)
Burlington Bees players
Inland Empire 66ers of San Bernardino players
Los Angeles Angels players
Major League Baseball outfielders
Major League Baseball second basemen
Mesa Solar Sox players
Mobile BayBears players
Norfolk Tides players
Orem Owlz players
People from Roswell, Georgia
21st-century African-American sportspeople